South Korea competed at the 2014 Winter Paralympics in Sochi, Russia, held between 7–16 March 2014.

Alpine skiing

Men

Women

Cross-country skiing

Men

Women

Relay

Ice sledge hockey

Team
Cho Byeong-seok
Cho Young-jae
Choi Bae-suk
Chung Young-hoon
Han Min-su
Jang Dong-shin
Jang Jong-ho
Jung Seung-hwan
Kim Dea-jung
Kim Young-sung
Lee Jong-kyung
Lee Ju-seung
Lee Yong-min
Park Sang-hyeon
Park Woo-chul
Sa Sung-keun
Yu Man-gyun

Preliminaries

5–8 Classification Play-offs

7th Place Game

Wheelchair curling

Team

Standings

Results

Draw 1
Saturday, March 8, 9:30

Draw 2
Saturday, March 8, 15:30

Draw 4
Sunday, March 9, 15:30

Draw 5
Monday, March 10, 9:30

Draw 6
Monday, March 10, 15:30

Draw 7
Tuesday, March 11, 9:30

Draw 9
Wednesday, March 12, 9:30

Draw 11
Thursday, March 13, 9:30

Draw 12
Thursday, March 13, 15:30

See also
South Korea at the Paralympics
South Korea at the 2014 Winter Olympics

References

Nations at the 2014 Winter Paralympics
2014
Winter Paralympics